The NEVER Openweight Championship is a professional wrestling championship owned by the New Japan Pro-Wrestling (NJPW) promotion. NEVER is an acronym of the terms "New Blood", "Evolution", "Valiantly", "Eternal", and "Radical" and was a NJPW-promoted series of events, which featured younger up-and-coming talent and outside wrestlers not signed to the promotion. The project was officially announced on July 12, 2010, and held its first event on August 24, 2010.

There have been 38 reigns shared among 21 wrestlers with one vacancy. Masato Tanaka was the first champion in the title's history. He also holds the record for the longest reign in the title's history at  days during his only reign. Tomohiro Ishii has the most reigns, with six. Michael Elgin's only reign of 8 days is the shortest in the title's history. Minoru Suzuki is the oldest champion when he won it at 52 years old while Will Ospreay is the youngest champion at 25 years old.

Tama Tonga is the current champion in his second reign. He defeated Karl Anderson on January 4, 2023 at Wrestle Kingdom 17 in Tokyo, Japan.

Title history

Combined reigns

See also
NEVER (professional wrestling)
NEVER Openweight 6-Man Tag Team Championship
IWGP U-30 Openweight Championship

References

External links
Official title history at njpw.co.jp
Title history at Wrestling-Titles.com

New Japan Pro-Wrestling championships
NEVER Openweight Championship